Hokejski klub Olimpija, currently named HK Slovenske železnice Olimpija due to sponsorship reasons, is an ice hockey club from Ljubljana, Slovenia. The club competes in the ICE Hockey League and the Slovenian League. Founded in 2004 as a farm team of HDD Olimpija, the club turned professional in 2017 after HDD Olimpija folded. Olimpija won the Slovenian Championship three times, in 2019, 2022 and 2023, and the Alps Hockey League twice, in 2019 and 2021. Olimpija play their home games at Tivoli Hall.

History
HK Olimpija was founded in 2004 with the primary task of educating young players and promoting ice hockey in Ljubljana and its surroundings.

The history of ice hockey in Ljubljana dates back to 1928, when SK Ilirija was founded. In 1932, they played the first official ice hockey match in Slovenia. The club changed its name several times before becoming Olimpija in 1962. HDD Olimpija was dissolved in 2017. After the dissolution, HK Olimpija reassembled the professional team.

In addition to the men's professional team, the club also has a women's team. They won six consecutive national titles between 2016–17 and 2021–22.

Early years (2004–2017)
Initially, the club focused on developing young players. As a farm team of HDD Olimpija, they played in the Slovenian League for several seasons, finishing third as their best result in the 2010–11 season.

Successes with a professional team (2017–2021)
In the 2017–18 season, the newly established professional team played its inaugural season in the Alps Hockey League and finished as runners-up in the Slovenian League and the Slovenian Cup. In 2018–19, Olimpija won the "treble" after winning all three competitions in which they participated: the Alps Hockey League, the Slovenian League and the Slovenian Cup. The following season they won the Cup again, while the other two competitions were cancelled due to the COVID-19 pandemic. In the 2020–21 season, Olimpija defended the AHL title and became the first club to win the competition multiple times. However, they failed to defend the national title, narrowly losing 3–2 in the final against their rivals HDD Jesenice.

Return of ICE Hockey League to Ljubljana (2021–present)
In the 2021–22 season, Olimpija joined the international ICE Hockey League, where HDD Olimpija previously played until 2017.

Club identity

Colours and badge
Olimpija's traditional colours in all sports are green and white. These two colours are consistent with the colours of the flag of Ljubljana. The club plays home matches in mostly green uniforms, while the away kits are predominantly white. The badge represents a dragon, holding an ice hockey stick. The dragon is also the city's symbol, representing power, courage and wisdom. Derived from the city symbols, Olimpija's nicknames are Zmaji (The Dragons) and Zeleno-beli (The Green and Whites).

Supporters and rivalries

In addition to fans from Central Slovenia and other parts of the country, Olimpija has two official supporters groups. Ledeni zmaji (The Ice Dragons) are exclusively fans of the ice hockey club, while the Green Dragons mostly attend football matches of NK Olimpija and attend the most important matches and derbies of HK Olimpija.

HK Olimpija's main rivals are HDD Jesenice. The matches between the two sides are referred to as the "Eternal Derby". Both clubs and their predecessors from the same cities have contested over 500 matches against each other.

Arena
The team play their home matches at Tivoli Hall, a 7,000 all-seated ice hall in Ljubljana. The hall opened in 1965 and was most recently renovated in 2020.

Players

Current roster
Updated on 8 February 2023

|}

Honours

Slovenian Championship
Winners (3): 2018–19, 2021–22, 2022–23
Runners-up (2): 2017–18, 2020–21

Alps Hockey League
Winners (2): 2018–19, 2020–21

Slovenian Cup
Winners (4): 2018–19, 2019–20, 2021–22, 2022–23
Runners-up (1): 2017–18

References

External links
Official website 
Hokej.si profile 

Ice hockey clubs established in 2004
HDD Olimpija Ljubljana
Sports clubs in Ljubljana
2004 establishments in Slovenia
Slohokej League teams
Slovenian Ice Hockey League teams
Austrian Hockey League teams
Ice hockey teams in Slovenia